Lyudmila Alexandrovna Shagalova (April 6, 1923 – March 13, 2012) was a Russian film supporting actress, active during the Soviet era. She was named a People's Artist of Russia in 1977.

Shagalova was born in Rahačoŭ, Gomel Governorate, Russian SFSR, now Belarus. Her Soviet cinema credits include The Young Guard in 1948, for which she and rest of the film's cast won a Stalin Prize. Other films include Balzaminov's Marriage in 1964, and the Wounded Game in 1977. Her husband Vyacheslav Shumsky (1921–2011) was an award-winning cinematographer.

Shagalova died on March 13, 2012, at the age of 88. Moscow Mayor Sergey Sobyanin released a statement in response to her death saying, "An actress of great talent who had a considerable impact on the history of the national film art. Many generations will always love the images created by her."

Partial filmography

Semiklassniki (1938) - Lyolya
The Young Guard (1948) - Valeriya Borts
Proshchay, Amerika! (1949)
Vernye druz'ya (1954) - Katya
Isini chamovidnen mtidan (1954) - Nastia Bulanova
Hastseatiroj voronumnere (1955) - Natasha
Delo N. 306 (1956) - Lyudmila
'Ryadom s nami (1958) - Nina
Tsel ego zhizni (1958) - Nina Kostrova
Ya vam pishu... (1959)
  (1959) - Koretskaya
Rovesnik veka (1960) - Dusya
Duel (1961) - Nadezhda Fyodorovna
Samye pervye (1962) - Vera Kalugina
713 Requests Permission to Land (1962) - Teresa
 (1962)
 (1963) - Varvara, aktrisa
A Tale of Lost Times (1964) - old Marousia
 (1964) - Galya
Balzaminov's Marriage (1965) - mother of Balzaminov
Ot semi do dvenadtsati (1965) - Natasha
Malchik i devochka (1966) - Woman in Kimono
Dyadushkin son (1966) - Zyablova
Out of Boredom [«Скуки ради»] (1968) - Sofia Ivanovna
13 porucheniy (1969)
Odin iz nas (1971) - Musya
Ostrov sokrovishch (1972) - Mrs. Hawkins
Boy s tenyu (1972)
Dacha (1973) - Mariya Mikhalovna sosedka po dacha
Privalov's Millions (1973) - Khionia Zaplatina
...A vy lyubili kogda-nibud? (1975)
It Can't Be! (1975) - mother of Catherine
Neznakomy naslednik (1976) - Alevtina - maty Sergeya
Au-u! (1976) - (segment "Chto nasha zhizn'!? ili Chto nasha zhizn'!?")
Wounded Game (1977) - Nina Grigorievna
Rudin (1977)
Mustached Nanny (1978) - Marina Mikhalchuk
Posledniy shans (1978)
Poka bezumstvuyet mechta (1978)
Vzroslyy syn (1979)
Sakhli lesnayaze (1980)
Ledyanaya vnuchka (1980) - Grandma / Großmutter Katerina
Sitsilianskaya zashchita (1981) - Anna Lebedeva
Noch na chetvyortom kruge (1981)
Inoplanetyanka (1984) - Mother
Tantsploshchadka (1986) - Mariya Nikolaevna
Ssuda na brak (1987)
Where is the Nophelet? (1988) - Yelena Arkadyevna (final film role)

References

External links

1923 births
2012 deaths
Soviet film actresses
Russian film actresses
Actresses from Moscow
Stalin Prize winners